Bayside P-12 College is a public, co-educational prep-year 12  school in Melbourne, Australia. It spans three campuses, in Altona North, Newport and Williamstown. Founded as Bayside Secondary College amidst the forced school amalgamations of the Kennett Government in the early 1990s, the school was born from the merger of Altona North High School, Altona North Technical School, Williamstown Technical School and Paisley High School. Later on it merged with Altona Gate Primary School. It has sister school relationships with Anjo Higashi High School in Japan, and Eastwood College in Lebanon.

Notable alumni
Gareth Widdop
Drury Low

References

Public high schools in Melbourne
Public primary schools in Melbourne
Buildings and structures in the City of Hobsons Bay